This is a list of countries by total imports, based on the International Trade Centre except for the European Union.

See also

 List of countries by exports
 List of countries by leading trade partners
 List of U.S. states and territories by exports and imports

Notes

References

Imports
Import
International trade-related lists

de:Welthandel/Tabellen und Grafiken#Import nach Ländern